Lipovec is a village and municipality in Martin District in the Žilina Region of northern Slovakia.

History
In historical records the village was first mentioned in 1395.

Geography
The municipality lies at an altitude of 380 metres and covers an area of 12.756 km². It has a population of about 844 people.

External links
https://web.archive.org/web/20080111223415/http://www.statistics.sk/mosmis/eng/run.html

Villages and municipalities in Martin District